The Diamond Smugglers is a non-fiction work by Ian Fleming that was first published in 1957 in the United Kingdom and in 1958 in the United States. The book is based on two weeks of interviews Fleming undertook with John Collard, a member of the International Diamond Security Organization (IDSO), which was headed by Sir Percy Sillitoe, the ex-chief of MI5 who worked for the diamond company De Beers.

The IDSO was formed by Sillitoe to combat the smuggling of diamonds from Africa, where, it was estimated, £10 million (£ in  pounds) worth of gems were being smuggled every year out of South Africa alone. The book expands upon articles Fleming wrote for The Sunday Times in 1957.

Fleming was better known as the author of a series of books about his super-spy creation, James Bond; The Diamond Smugglers is one of two non-fiction books he wrote. It was broadly well-received, although some reviewers commented on the stories not being new.

Synopsis
The Diamond Smugglers is the account of Ian Fleming's meeting with John Collard, a member of the International Diamond Security Organisation (IDSO). The book takes the form of background narrative by Fleming of where the two men met, interspersed with the interview between Fleming and Collard, who is introduced under the pseudonym of "John Blaize".

Collard relates how he was recruited into the IDSO by Sir Percy Sillitoe, the ex-head of MI5, under whom Collard had worked. The book goes on to look at the activities of the IDSO from the end of 1954 until the operation was closed down in April 1957, when its job was complete. Collard explained that the IDSO was set up at the instigation of the Chairman of De Beers, Sir Philip Oppenheimer, after an Interpol report stated that £10 million of diamonds were being smuggled out of South Africa each year, as well as additional amounts from Sierra Leone, Portuguese West Africa, the Gold Coast and Tanganyika.

As well as providing a history of the IDSO's operations, Collard relates a number of illustrative vignettes concerning the diamond smuggling cases he and the organisation dealt with.

Background
Fleming became interested in diamond smuggling after reading an article in The Sunday Times in 1954 concerning the Sierra Leone diamond industry. Philip Brownrigg, an old friend from Eton and a senior exec of De Beers, arranged for Fleming to visit the London Diamond Club to see diamonds being sorted and polished. In 1955 Brownrigg also introduced Fleming to Sir Percy Sillitoe, former head of MI5, who was working for De Beers and investigating the illicit diamond trade through the International Diamond Security Organisation. Fleming met Sillitoe and used much of the research as background material for his fictional Bond novel, Diamonds Are Forever.

Fleming retained an interest in the subject and when Sillitoe suggested to the editor of The Sunday Times, Denis Hamilton, that the paper may want to write a story on the International Diamond Security Organization, Hamilton offered the story to Fleming. Sillitoe also offered his deputy, retired MI5 officer John Collard, as liaison for Fleming to interview. During World War II, Collard had assisted in the planning of Operation Overlord as part of MI11 and had joined MI5 under Sillitoe at the war's end. Whilst in MI5 he played a major role in the capture and conviction of the atomic spy Klaus Fuchs, before Sillitoe had approached him in 1954 to work for the International Diamond Security Organisation.

Fleming and Collard met in Tangiers on 13 April 1957; Fleming considered Collard to be a "reluctant hero, like all Britain's best secret agents". The pair spent two weeks discussing the issue of diamond smuggling, with Collard explaining what happened in South Africa and Sierra Leone. Fleming would then dictate an average of 5,000 words a day to a secretary.

When the drafts of the books were shown to De Beers they objected to a number of areas and threatened an injunction against Fleming and The Sunday Times, which resulted in much material being removed. The Sunday Times serialised the book over six weeks, starting on 15 September 1957 and finishing on 20 October 1957.

Release and reception
The Diamond Smugglers was published in the UK in November 1957, by Jonathan Cape, was 160 pages long and cost 12 shillings 6d. The book was published in the US on 13 May 1958, by Macmillan and cost $3.50.

Reviews
The book received largely positive reviews. Michael Crampton, writing for The Sunday Times considered it an "exciting and richly fascinating account" and thought Fleming authored a book that "ringing true as fact, is at the same time as highly entertaining as any fiction." The Times Literary Supplement obtained the services of the Earl of Cardigan to review the book. He noted that "the book is put together with a skill one would expect from Mr. Fleming", which leads to something that is "very entertaining reading".

Reviewing for The Observer, Anthony Sampson thought the book had "sparkle", adding that "it is often difficult to remember that we are not listening to his old hero Mr. James Bond." Sampson noted that the book included "several yarns which are worthy of the best spy-stories". The reviewer for The Economist enjoyed the book, but considered that while many of the stories "make good reading ... they are not new". For The New York Times, John Barkham thought that Fleming's foray into non-fiction produced "mixed results". Although he found the subject interesting, the basis in interview resulted in a "choppy book" that was "no more than an interim report".

Attempted film adaptation

Shortly after publication, The Rank Group offered £13,500 (£ in  pounds) for the film rights to the book, which Fleming accepted, telling them he would write a full story outline for an extra £1,000. Several contemporary newspaper reports referred to the project as "The Diamond Spy". British producer George Willoughby subsequently obtained the rights for the book from Rank and tried to make a film with the actor Richard Todd, eventually commissioning a screenplay from Australian writer Jon Cleary, who finished a script in October 1964 that remained faithful in spirit to Fleming's book while also featuring elements familiar from the James Bond films. Kingsley Amis was also hired as a story consultant; in a letter to author Theo Richmond on 20 December 1965 Amis wrote he was having 'a horrible time' of writing an outline for Willoughby. W.H. "Bill" Canaway, co-author of the screenplay for The Ipcress File, was also hired to work on the script. At one point, film director John Boorman was involved. Despite interest from Anglo-Amalgamated Film Distributors and Anglo Embassy Productions in early 1966, the project was shelved later that year.

Fleming's 1956 Bond novel, Diamonds Are Forever, also dealt with diamond smuggling, albeit from Sierra Leone rather than South Africa; however, the 1971 film adaptation of the novel featured a diamond-smuggling operation shipping out of South Africa.

References

Bibliography

External links
 

1957 non-fiction books
Books by Ian Fleming
Diamond industry
Jonathan Cape books